Brian Blade Fellowship is the debut studio album by Brian Blade Fellowship.

Track listing
All tracks composed by Brian Blade; except where indicated

 "Red River Revel" - 9:29
 "The Undertow" - 7:26
 "Folklore" – 11:05
 "In Spite of Everything" - 4:20
 "Lifeline" (Jon Cowherd) - 7:44
 "Mohave" - 9:08
 "If You See Lurah" - 4:31
 "Loving Without Asking" - 8:00

Personnel
Brian Blade – drums
Melvin Butler – soprano and tenor saxophones
Jon Cowherd – piano, Wurlitzer
Dave Easley – pedal steel guitar
Daniel Lanois – mando guitar
Jeff Parker - acoustic and electric guitar
Christopher Thomas – acoustic bass
Myron Walden – alto saxophone

References

1998 debut albums
Brian Blade albums
Blue Note Records albums
Albums produced by Daniel Lanois